Sameh Zoabi is a Palestinian Israeli film writer and director best known for his 2019 film Tel Aviv on Fire.

Childhood and education
Zoabi grew up in Iksal, a village near Nazareth, Israel.  His father is a farmer.  He studied at Tel Aviv University, graduating with a dual degree in film studies and literature, and then attended Columbia University on a Fulbright scholarship, receiving his MFA in 2005.

Zoabi lives in Brooklyn and teaches at New York University.

Career
Zoabi made Be Quiet, a short film, in 2005. His feature length debut was Man Without a Cell Phone (2010). He won Best Screenplay Award at 12th Asia Pacific Screen Awards for Tel Aviv on Fire (2019). The movie was also nominated for a 2019 European Film Award for Best Comedy and was Luxembourg's submission to the 92nd Academy Awards for Best International Feature Film.

References

Palestinian film directors
Israeli film directors
Year of birth missing (living people)
Living people
Columbia University School of the Arts alumni
Tel Aviv University alumni
Tisch School of the Arts faculty
Fulbright alumni